Year 171 (CLXXI) was a common year starting on Monday (link will display the full calendar) of the Julian calendar. At the time, it was known as the Year of the Consulship of Severus and Herennianus (or, less frequently, year 924 Ab urbe condita). The denomination 171 for this year has been used since the early medieval period, when the Anno Domini calendar era became the prevalent method in Europe for naming years.

Events 
 By place 
 Roman Empire 
 Emperor Marcus Aurelius forms a new military command, the praetentura Italiae et Alpium. Aquileia is relieved, and the Marcomanni are evicted from Roman territory.
 Marcus Aurelius signs a peace treaty with the Quadi and the Sarmatian Iazyges. The Germanic tribes of the Hasdingi (Vandals) and the Lacringi become Roman allies.  
 Armenia and Mesopotamia become protectorates of the Roman Empire.
 The Costoboci cross the Danube (Dacia) and ravage Thrace in the Balkan Peninsula. They reach Eleusis, near Athens, and destroy the temple of the Eleusinian Mysteries.
 May – June – Aelius Aristides, Greek orator, delivers a public speech in Smyrna, lamenting the damage recently inflicted to the sacred site of Eleusis.

Births 
 Sima Lang, Chinese official and politician (d. 217)
 Tian Yu, Chinese general and politician (d. 252)
 Xu Gan, Chinese philosopher and poet (d. 218)
 Zhao Yan, Chinese general and politician (d. 245)

Deaths

References